Corman may refer to:

People
 Corman (surname)

Places
 Çorman, Kalbajar, Azerbaijan
 Çorman, Lachin, Azerbaijan
 Rural Municipality of Corman Park No. 344, Saskatchewan, Canada
 Saskatoon/Corman Air Park (airport), Corman Park, Saskatchewan, Canada
 R.J. Corman Railroad/Pennsylvania Lines (railroad tracks), Pennsylvania, USA

Other uses
 The Corman Poe cycle, films connected to Roger Corman and the stories of Edgar Allan Poe
 R.J. Corman Railroad Group
 Corman Common Lisp, a computer programming language

See also

 
 Çorman (disambiguation)
 Korman (disambiguation)
 Corpsman